Aman Saini is an Indian archer. He won the silver medal Asian Games 2018 in the Men's compound archery team event. He completed his studies at Richmond's global school, Delhi, and trained under his coach Surender Garg.

References

Living people
Indian male archers
Medalists at the 2018 Asian Games
Asian Games silver medalists for India
Asian Games medalists in archery
Archers at the 2018 Asian Games
Year of birth missing (living people)
Competitors at the 2022 World Games
21st-century Indian people